Sparganothina nephela is a species of moth of the family Tortricidae. It is found in Nicaragua, Costa Rica, Panama and Ecuador.

References

Moths described in 1913
Sparganothini